Arkansas's 2006 state elections were held November 7, 2006.  Primaries were held May 23 and runoffs, if necessary, were held June 13.  Arkansas elected seven constitutional officers, 17 of 35 state senate seats, all 100 house seats and 28 district prosecuting attorneys, and voted on one constitutional amendment and one referred question.  Non-partisan judicial elections were held the same day as the party primaries for four Supreme Court justices, four appeals circuit court judges, and eight district court judges.

Constitutional Officers

Governor

Democrat
Mike Beebe - Attorney General

Republican
Asa Hutchinson - former Undersecretary of Homeland Security

Green Party
Jim Lendall (ran for Governor 2006 - former state representative)

Third Parties
Rod Bryan (independent) - musician

Lieutenant Governor

Democratic Primary

Bill Halter - former Social Security commissioner
Tim Wooldridge - state senator, District 11
Mike Hathorn - former state representative, Arkansas Rural Development Commissioner
Jay Martin - state representative, North Little Rock
Halter came in first in the Democratic primary:

Democratic Run-off
Halter also won the run-off:

Republican Primary
Jim Holt - state senator, District 35
Charles "Chuck" Banks - former US Attorney
Douglas Jay Matayo - state representative, Springdale

Holt won the primary:

Secretary of State

Democrat

Charlie Daniels - incumbent

Republican
Jim Lagrone - businessman, former Baptist pastor

Green Party
Ralph "Marty" Scully - retiree, former Teamster

Attorney General

Democratic Primary

Dustin McDaniel - State Representative, District 75 (Jonesboro), former attorney.
Paul Suskie - North Little Rock City Attorney, Afghanistan Conflict veteran.
 Robert Leo Herzfeld - Saline County Prosecutor.
McDaniel came in first:

Democratic Run-off
McDaniel also won the run-off, with exactly 87,000 votes:

Republican
Gunner DeLay - former state senator, attorney

Green Party
Rebekah Kennedy - civil rights attorney and Public Relations chair for the Green Party of Arkansas

Auditor of State

Democrat

Jim Wood - incumbent

Green Party
Michael Bolzenius - advertising salesman

State Treasurer

Democratic Primary

Martha Shoffner - former state representative, 2002 auditor candidate
Mac Campbell - tax attorney, former counsel to Senator Blanche Lincoln
Don House - businessman, state representative (Walnut Ridge)

Shoffner lead solidly, but not enough to avoid a run-off:

Democratic Run-off
Shoffner won the run-off:

Republican
Chris Morris - staffer for Governor Mike Huckabee

Green Party
Brock Carpenter - student, Hendrix College

Commissioner of State Lands

Democrat

Mark Wilcox - incumbent

Green Party
R. David Lewis - attorney

Judicial Elections
Judicial elections are nonpartisan.

Supreme Court
Four Supreme Court associate justices were up for reelection to eight-year terms.

Position 2
Donald Louis Corbin - incumbent
Roger Harrod - Maumelle district court judge

Position 5
Paul Danielson - circuit judge for the 15th circuit
Wendell Griffen - appeals judge, District 6

Position 6
Annabelle Clinton Imber - incumbent.  Uncontested for reelection.

Position 7
Robert Brown - incumbent.  Uncontested for reelection.

Court of Appeals
Elections were held on primary election day for four appeals judges to new eight-year terms.  All candidates stood unopposed and were reelected by acclamation:

Judge John Pittman - District 1, Position 1
Denzil Price Marshall - District 1, Position 2
Judge Terry Crabtree - District 3, Position 2
Judge Larry Vaught - District 6, Position 2

Circuit Courts
Elections were also held on primary election day for eight district court judges, for six-year terms.  Necessary run-offs will be held with the general election.

Unopposed:
Judge John Mark Lindsay - District 4, Division 6
Judge Ellen Brantley - District 6, Division 16, Subdistrict 6.2
Judge Mackie Pierce - District 6, Division 17, Subdistrict 6.2

General Assembly Elections

State Senate

17 senators are up for reelection to four-year terms.

State House
All 100 House seats are up for re-election.

Referendums
Constitutional Amendment 1

Amendment 1 would amend the Arkansas Constitution to lift prohibitions against gambling from bingos and lotteries conducted by authorized nonprofit organizations, such as churches or volunteer fire organizations.

Referred Question 1

Question 1 would allow the state to issue no more than $250 million in bonds to finance the development of technology and facilities for state institutions of higher education.

See also
Arkansas gubernatorial election, 2006

References

 
Arkansas